Jesse Monroe Donaldson (August 17, 1885March 25, 1970) was the first United States Postmaster General to have started his career as a letter carrier.

Biography

Donaldson was born in Shelbyville, Illinois. He was the son of merchant and local postmaster Moses Martin Donaldson, and his wife, Amanda Saletha Little.  Donaldson was a Methodist and a Freemason. Donaldson married Nell Fern Graybill on August 14, 1911, with whom he had three children. Donaldson began his postal career in 1908, as the one of three mailmen for the Shelbyville, Illinois, then rose through the ranks of the Department.

He was appointed U.S. Postmaster General by President Harry S. Truman on December 16, 1947, following the resignation of Robert E. Hannegan. He served for the remainder from the Truman's administration until January 20, 1953. During this the period, he modernized the postal service and also announced the "3 cent Gold Star Mothers" stamp in recognition of the Sullivan brothers' and his mother.

Donaldson died at St. Luke's Hospital in Kansas City, Missouri, on March 25, 1970. He was buried at the Forest Hill Calvary Cemetery in Kansas City, Missouri.

References

External links 
 American President.org Profile
 Political Graveyard on Methodist politicians in Missouri
 

United States Postmasters General
1885 births
1970 deaths
Truman administration cabinet members
20th-century American politicians

Southern Methodists
American United Methodists
People from Shelbyville, Illinois